Lazzara Ledge is a flat-topped ridge rising to  northeast of Mount Dragovan in the Apocalypse Peaks of Victoria Land. The ledge comprises the central part of the divide between Haselton Glacier and Wreath Valley. Named in 2005 by the Advisory Committee on Antarctic Names after Matthew A. Lazzara of the USAP Antarctic Meteorological Research Center field team, who worked in the McMurdo Station area and at other Antarctic locations in eight summer seasons, 1994–2004.

References

Ridges of Victoria Land